Mogi Mirim is a municipality located in the eastern part of São Paulo State, in Brazil. The population is 93,650 (2020 est.) in an area of 498 km². The elevation is 611 m.

Mogi Mirim is around 65 km from Campinas, the biggest city in the region, and 129 km from the capital São Paulo.

Name 
The origin of the name Mogi Mirim is the Tupi language, a Brazilian indigenous language. Basically this name means "small snakes's river", didactically however avoiding a deep explanation about the Tupi language:

- Mog = Snake

- i = River

- Mirim = Small.

Economy 
The local economy have high contribution from agricultural and industrial activities.

The main agricultural goods produced are tomatoes, cassava, sugarcane and oranges.

The main industrial chain is auto parts manufacture, but there are also beverage, shoes and small size industry. Some large companies have operations in the City as Mars (Petcare), Alpargatas and Monroe.

Sport 
The local soccer team is Mogi Mirim Sport Club that nowadays plays in the first division from State League Campeonato Paulista and in the second division from the National League Campeonato Brasileiro.

One famous player that played for this team in the 90's is Rivaldo, a world champion with the Brazilian team in the 2002 World Cup.

References

External links 

 Official home page (in Portuguese).